Jeff Dresser is a retired American soccer midfielder who played professionally in the USL A-League.

Dresser played for the Michigan Arrows youth club growing up.  He graduated from Flint Southwestern Academy, then attended Cornerstone University, where he was a 1993 NAIA Second-Team All-American In 1994, he earned First-Team All-American honors.  In 1995, Dresser, while playing for the Grand Rapids Explosion, tied with Gabe Jones for the goal scoring lead in the 1995 USISL Premier League season.  In 1996, he turned professional with the Charlotte Eagles in the USISL Pro League.  In 1997, the Eagles moved down to the USISL D-3 Pro League.  In 1998, Dresser left the Eagles to sign with the Indiana Blast.  In 1999, the Blast moved up from the D-3 Pro League to the USL A-League.  Dresser remained with Indiana through the 2003 season. In 2020, Jeff Dresser led the Carmel Christian Cougars to their first state soccer title and a sixth-place finish in the national power rankings. This led to him winning the 2021 NCSCA 4A Coach of the year.

References

Living people
1973 births
American soccer players
Charlotte Eagles players
Indiana Blast players
USL League Two players
USL Second Division players
A-League (1995–2004) players
West Michigan Edge players
Association football midfielders
Cornerstone University alumni